Lists of Pakistani actors are split by gender.

 List of Pakistani actresses
 List of Pakistani male actors

Pakistani